Frank Boyd Merriman, 1st Baron Merriman of Knutsford  (28 April 1880 – 18 January 1962), known as Boyd Merriman, was a British Conservative politician and judge.

Education
Merriman was born in Knutsford, Cheshire, and educated at Winchester College. He did not go to university, but became an articled clerk with a firms of solicitors in Manchester, and later studied for the bar, and was a pupil in Gordon Hewart's chambers. He was called to the bar at the Inner Temple in 1904. During World War I, he served with the Manchester Regiment and was appointed OBE in 1918. After the war, Merriman was made a King's Counsel (KC) in 1919, and appointed Recorder of Wigan in 1920.

Merriman had a large practice at the common law bar and on the Northern Circuit. Prominent cases in which he appeared include the 1927 libel case Wright v Gladstone, which arose of defamatory statements concerning the private life of former prime minister William Ewart Gladstone. In 1929, he represented Zionist organisations in front of the Shaw Commission, appointed to investigate the Palestine riots.

Political and judicial career
Merriman was elected at the 1924 general election as Member of Parliament (MP) for Manchester Rusholme, and served as Solicitor General under Stanley Baldwin from 1928 to 1929 and under Ramsay MacDonald from 1932 to 1933, receiving the customary knighthood upon appointment.

He left Parliament in 1933, when he was appointed as President of the Probate, Divorce and Admiralty Division of the High Court, when he was also sworn of the Privy Council. Under his presidency, the Division saw a steep decline in the volume of admiralty cases due to a worldwide decline in shipping, but a large increase in its divorce work, brought in part by the passage of the Matrimonial Causes Act 1937. In 1949, Merriman was considered for appointment as a lord of appeal in ordinary, but ultimately passed over in favour of Sir Cyril Radcliffe.

Merriman was elevated to the peerage in 1941 as Baron Merriman, of Knutsford in the County Palatine of Chester. In 1950 he was appointed a Knight Grand Cross of the Royal Victorian Order (GCVO).

Family 

Lord Merriman married three times. He married firstly Eva Mary Freer (d. 1919) in 1907. They had two daughters. He married secondly Olive McLaren (d. 1952) in 1920. He married thirdly Jane Lamb in 1953.
The peerage became extinct on Lord Merriman's death in London in 1962, aged 81. He had been due to deliver a dissenting speech the House of Lords appeal Ross-Smith v Ross-Smith that day, which was instead given by Lord Hodson.

He was survived by his third wife. He is buried in Brompton Cemetery, London, on the west side of the central enclosed roundel.

References 

 Dictionary of National Biography: Merriman, (Frank) Boyd,

External links 
 

|-

1880 births
1962 deaths
People from Knutsford
People educated at Winchester College
Manchester Regiment officers
British Army personnel of World War I
Officers of the Order of the British Empire
Knights Bachelor
Knights Grand Cross of the Royal Victorian Order
Solicitors General for England and Wales
Conservative Party (UK) MPs for English constituencies
UK MPs 1924–1929
UK MPs 1929–1931
UK MPs 1931–1935
UK MPs who were granted peerages
Members of the Privy Council of the United Kingdom
Burials at Brompton Cemetery
Members of the Judicial Committee of the Privy Council
Conservative Party (UK) hereditary peers
Barons created by George VI
Presidents of the Probate, Divorce and Admiralty Division